The 1986 Berlin Marathon was the 13th running of the annual marathon race held in Berlin, West Germany, held on 28 September. Poland's Bogusław Psujek won the men's race in 2:11:03 hours, while the women's race was won by West Germany's Charlotte Teske in 2:32:10. Switzerland's Heinz Frei (1:46:44) and Denmark's Connie Hansen (2:32:23), won the men's and women's wheelchair races. A total of 11,450 runners finished the race, comprising 10,574 men and 876 women.

Results

Men

Women

References 

 Results. Association of Road Racing Statisticians. Retrieved 2020-06-03.

External links 
 Official website

1986
Berlin Marathon
1980s in West Berlin
Berlin Marathon
Berlin Marathon